Frederick Nymeyer (November 12, 1897 – February 18, 1981) was an industrialist from South Holland, Illinois, and a vocal advocate of early libertarianism and Austrian economics.

Nymeyer founded the Libertarian Press and was largely responsible for bringing the economic writings of Eugen von Böhm-Bawerk to the United States. A personal friend of Ludwig von Mises, Nymeyer was also an eager proponent of Austrian economics.

His writings evidence both a commitment to free market principles and a devotion to his Dutch Calvinist faith. His most thorough work, Minimal Religion, posits the incompatibility of socialist ethics with the Christian faith. In Social Action, Hundred Nineteen, he argued forcefully against the social gospel. Progressive Calvinism, later renamed First Principles in Morality and Economics, was a periodical authored by Nymeyer. Directed primarily at an audience of Dutch Reformed youth, the publication linked Christian principles to libertarian political theory.

Nymeyer's writings also touch on theological ideas. In the heated debate over Common Grace, Nymeyer sided against the official position of his denomination (Christian Reformed Church), accepting instead a position similar to that advocated by Herman Hoeksema and the Protestant Reformed Churches.

References

External links 
 Progressive Calvinism archives
 Libertarian Press, Inc.

1897 births
1981 deaths
20th-century American businesspeople
American Calvinist and Reformed theologians
American members of the Dutch Reformed Church
American libertarians
Austrian School economists
Christian libertarians
People from South Holland, Illinois
20th-century Calvinist and Reformed theologians
Economists from Illinois
20th-century American economists